The New Addams Family is a sitcom that aired from October 1998 to August 1999 on YTV in Canada and Fox Family in the United States and CITV in the United Kingdom on weekends. It was produced by Shavick Entertainment and Saban Entertainment as a revival of the 1960s series The Addams Family. The series was shot in Vancouver, British Columbia, Canada.

Plot
The Addams Family consists of husband and wife, Gomez and Morticia Addams, their children, Wednesday and Pugsley, as well as Grandmama, Uncle Fester, and their butler, Lurch. The Addams' are a close-knit extended family with decidedly macabre interests and supernatural abilities. No explanation for their powers is explicitly given in the series. Some of the episodes in this series are remakes of the original TV series' episodes with some episodes being exclusive to this show.

Later episodes introduce a relative named Grandpapa Addams who had similar traits to Gomez. Grandpapa Addams was played by John Astin, who had played Gomez in the original series.

Cast

Main cast
 Glenn Taranto as Gomez Addams
 Ellie Harvie as Morticia Addams
 Brody Smith as Pugsley Addams
 Nicole Fugere as Wednesday Addams. Fugere was the only member of the Addams Family Reunion cast to return for the series.
 Betty Phillips as Eudora "Grandmama" Addams
 Michael Roberds as Uncle Fester
 John DeSantis as Lurch
 Steven Fox's Hand as Thing

Guest cast
 John Astin as Grandpapa Addams
 David Mylrea as Cousin Itt
 Paul Dobson as voice of Cousin Itt
 Tabitha St. Germain as Melancholia
 Demetri Goritsas as Simon
 Meredith Bain Woodward as Granny Frump
 Lisa Calder as Ophelia Frump
 Shoshoni as Kitty Kat

Production

Development
The series – shot in Vancouver – featured a new cast and was well received by viewers. Gomez Addams was played by Glenn Taranto, and Morticia by Ellie Harvie. The show reworked several storylines from the original series while incorporating modern elements, jokes, and references to episodes from the original series. John Astin, who played Gomez in the original series, appeared in a recurring role as Grandpapa Addams; Taranto patterned his performance after Astin's original version of Gomez.

Writing
One of the notable differences between the original show and the new series was that Wednesday and Pugsley (Nicole Fugere and Brody Smith respectively – the former reprising her role from Addams Family Reunion) were given expanded roles that highlighted their violent and sadistic personalities, made popular by The Addams Family film. Another element carried over from the films was Fester being Gomez's brother, whereas in the original show he had been Morticia's uncle.

Theme music
The new theme music, performed by the cast, was a departure from the familiar tune that had served most previous adaptations of the series. The familiar finger-snapping was present, albeit at a faster pace, accompanied by two different characters (first Lurch, then Gomez) saying the word "snap" twice in rapid succession to match the beat. It was written by Barron Abramovitch, Jeremy Sweet, and Michael Whittaker.

Episodes

Video games
7th Sense developed a Game Boy Color game based on the series, which was released in 2001 by Microids exclusively in Europe. Titus Interactive was going to release the game in America with the title The New Addams Family, but the American version was cancelled. Nova Productions released an electric shock machine based on the series in 1999, which was distributed by H. Betti Industries in America.

Reception

Awards and nominations
 Leo Awards for Best Overall Sound in a Dramatic Series – Tony Gronick (Nominated)
 Leo Award for Best Production Design in a Dramatic Series – Cathy Robertson (Nominated)
 Leo Award for Best Lead Performance by a Female in a Dramatic Series – Ellie Harvie (1999) (Nominated)
 Canadian Comedy Awards for Television – Performance – Female – Ellie Harvie (2000) (Nominated)
 Leo Award for Best Editing – Picture of a Music, Comedy or Variety Program or Series – Michele Conroy For episode "Tale of Long John Addams" (Won)
 Leo Award for Best Overall Sound in a Music, Comedy or Variety Program or Series – Rick Bal, Chester Biolowas, Vince Renaud, and Jo Rossi  (Won)
 Leo Award for Best Screenwriter of a Music, Comedy or Variety Program or Series – Rich Hosek and Arnold Rudnick For episode "Tale Of Long John Addams" (Won)
 Leo Award for Best Performance or Host in a Music, Comedy or Variety Program or Series – Ellie Harvie (Won)
 Leo Award for Best Sound – Greg Stewart (Won)

References

External links
 

1998 American television series debuts
1999 American television series endings
1990s American black comedy television series
1990s American teen sitcoms
1998 Canadian television series debuts
1999 Canadian television series endings
1990s Canadian teen sitcoms
The Addams Family television series
American fantasy television series
Canadian fantasy television series
English-language television shows
Fox Family Channel original programming
YTV (Canadian TV channel) original programming
Witchcraft in television
Television series about children
Television series about families
Television series by Corus Entertainment
Television series by Saban Entertainment
Television series reboots
Television shows filmed in Vancouver
1990s American horror comedy television series
Canadian horror comedy television series